In mathematics, an inner form of an algebraic group  over a field  is another algebraic group  such that there exists an isomorphism  between  and  defined over  (this means that  is a -form of ) and in addition, for every Galois automorphism  the automorphism  is an inner automorphism of  (i.e. conjugation by an element of ).

Being inner forms of each other is an equivalence relation on the set of -forms of a given algebraic group.

A form which is not inner is called an outer form. Two groups are inner forms of each other if and only if the actions they define are the same.

References

Algebraic groups